Velanai is a small village in Velanai Island off the coast of Jaffna Peninsula in the North of Sri Lanka.

The majority of the people are Hindus along with a minority of Christians. There are number of Hindu temples along with few churches. The village is also served by a dozen schools. Sir Vaithilingam Duraiswamy, a well known member of parliament during the British colonial period, and his son Yogendra Duraiswamy, a Hindu activist and well known diplomat, were born in Velanai.

Since 1983 Velanai has also been the scene of violence as part of the Sri Lankan civil war including the Allaipiddy massacre.

Etymology

The name Velanai is believed to have been derived from 2 terms combined into one word.  The first phrase name of the Vel which means spear. The second phrase anai means ashore. It is believed that the god Murugan's spear landed ashore of this island. Hence the name Valani. God Murugan is worshiped as a popular god among all the peoples in Velanai.

History

Archaeological evidence
Received per-historic archaeological evidence of ancient life in Saatti sea side suggested that there was a well-organized civilization emerged in this island.

Geography and climate
The total area of this island is nearly 36 km2.

Places of interest
 Vangalavadi Murugan Temple
 Velanai Perungukalm Muththumari amman
 Saatti Sea side
 Velanai ayyanar Kovil

Gallery

References

External links
 Velanai website
 Velanai website

Towns in Jaffna District
Island South DS Division